Stanley Marsh is a fictional character in the adult animated television series South Park. He is voiced by and loosely based on series co-creator Trey Parker. Stan is one of the series' four central characters, along with Kyle Broflovski, Eric Cartman, and Kenny McCormick. He debuted on television when South Park first aired on August 13, 1997, after having first appeared in The Spirit of Christmas shorts created by Parker and long-time collaborator Matt Stone in 1992 (Jesus vs. Frosty) and 1995 (Jesus vs. Santa).

Stan is an elementary school student who commonly has extraordinary experiences not typical of conventional small-town life in his fictional hometown of South Park, Colorado. Stan is generally depicted as logical, brave, patient and sensitive. He is outspoken in expressing his distinct lack of esteem for adults and their influences, as adult South Park residents rarely make use of their critical faculties.

Like the other South Park characters, Stan is animated by computer in a way to emulate the show's original method of cutout animation. He also appears in the full-length feature film South Park: Bigger, Longer & Uncut (1999), as well as South Park-related media and merchandise. While Parker and Stone portray Stan as having common childlike tendencies, his dialogue is often intended to reflect stances and views on more adult-oriented issues and has been frequently cited in numerous publications by experts in the fields of politics, religion, popular culture and philosophy.

Role in South Park
Prior to season 22, Stan lives in South Park at 260 Avenue de los Mexicanos with his parents Randy and Sharon Marsh. During this period, Randy, who has an advanced degree in geology, works for the federal government at an earthquake monitoring facility, and Sharon is a secretary at Tom's Rhinoplasty, a plastic surgery clinic. From season 22 onward, the family lives at a farm on the outskirts of town, where Randy raises marijuana and forces his reluctant family to assist him. Stan's family includes his 13-year-old sister Shelly, who bullies and beats him, and his centenarian grandfather, Marvin, who calls Stan "Billy". Stan attends South Park Elementary as part of Mr. Garrison's fourth-grade class. During the show's first 58 episodes (1997 through the season 4 episode "4th Grade" in 2000), Stan and the other main child characters were in the third grade. His birthday is listed as October 19 (the same day as co-creator Trey Parker), 2001 on his Facebook page during the season 14 episode "You Have 0 Friends". Stan is frequently embarrassed and annoyed by his father's antics and frequent acts of public drunkenness. Stan's relationship to his uncle Jimbo received moderate attention in the show's first two seasons.

While the show's other main characters have a defining characteristic (Kyle is the only Jewish kid, Cartman is an obese sociopath, and Kenny is poverty-stricken and suffers violent deaths), Stan was originally portrayed as the viewpoint character, being "a normal, average, American, mixed-up kid". However, beginning in season fifteen as part of the show's overall shift to more complex characterization, Stan has been cynical and depressed due to his dysfunctional family, particularly in Ass Burgers which shows him abusing alcohol on a daily basis simply to tolerate normal social interaction.

Stan is modeled after Parker, while Kyle is modeled after Stone. Stan and Kyle are best friends, and their relationship, which is intended to reflect the real-life friendship between Parker and Stone, is a common topic throughout the series. The two do have their disagreements but always reconcile without any long-term damage to their friendship. As is the case with his other friends and classmates, Stan is frequently at odds with Cartman, resenting Cartman's behavior and openly mocking his weight. Stan also shares a close friendship with Kenny, while Kenny professes that Stan is one of "the best friends a guy could have". Stan can understand Kenny's muffled voice perfectly and typically exclaims the catchphrase "Oh my God! They killed Kenny!" following one of Kenny's trademark deaths, allowing Kyle to follow up with "You bastards!" Stan is the only character in the group to have had a steady girlfriend, Wendy Testaburger, and their relationship was a recurring topic in the show's earlier seasons. Despite reconciling and declaring to be a couple again in the season 11 (2007) episode "The List" after Wendy had dumped him in the season seven (2003) episode "Raisins", their relationship has received relatively less focus in recent seasons. As a running gag, a nervous Stan often vomits whenever Wendy approaches to kiss or speak to him. Stan is considered particularly attractive by the girls in the class, which is a subtle joke as all of the fourth-grade boys besides Cartman and the two disabled children use the exact same model before hair, clothing, and skin color are added. In many episodes, Stan contemplates ethics in beliefs, moral dilemmas, and contentious issues, and will often reflect on the lessons he has attained with a speech that often begins with "You know, I learned something today...".

Character

Creation and design

An unnamed precursor to Stan first appeared in the first The Spirit of Christmas short, dubbed Jesus vs. Frosty, created by Parker and Stone in 1992 while they were students at the University of Colorado. The character was composed of construction paper cutouts and animated through the use of stop motion. When asked three years later by friend Brian Graden to create another short as a video Christmas card that he could send to friends, Parker and Stone created another similarly animated The Spirit of Christmas short, dubbed Jesus vs. Santa, in which Stan also appeared. Stan next appeared on August 13, 1997, when South Park debuted on Comedy Central with the episode "Cartman Gets an Anal Probe".

In the tradition of the show's animation style, Stan is composed of simple geometrical shapes and primary colors. He is not offered the same free range of motion associated with hand-drawn characters; his character is mostly shown from only one angle, and his movements are animated in an intentionally jerky fashion.
Ever since the show's third episode, "Weight Gain 4000" (season one, 1997), Stan, like all other characters on the show, has been animated with computer software, though he is portrayed to give the impression that the show still utilizes its original technique.

Stan is usually depicted in winter attire which consists of a brown jacket, blue jeans, red gloves/mittens, and a red-brimmed blue knit cap adorned with a decorative red pom-pom. In the rare instances, Stan is seen without his cap, he is shown to have shaggy black hair. He was given his full name in the season one episode "An Elephant Makes Love to a Pig", sharing his surname of "Marsh" with Parker's paternal step-grandfather. Parker specified that he came up with the voice of Stan while he and Stone were in film class, where they would speak in high-pitched childish voices, much to the annoyance of their film teachers. They would reuse these voices when South Park debuted. While originally voicing Stan without any computer manipulation, Parker now speaks within his normal vocal range while adding a childlike inflection. The recorded audio is then edited with Pro Tools, and the pitch is altered to make the voice sound more like that of a fourth grader.

Stan's birthday is October 19, which is also Trey Parker's birthday.

Personality and traits

Stan is foul-mouthed (a trait present in his friends as well) as a means for Parker and Stone to display how they claim young boys really talk when they are alone. In responding to certain situations, particularly during earlier seasons, Stan often exclaims "Dude, this is pretty fucked up right here". While Stan is cynical and profane, Parker still notes that there is an "underlying sweetness" to the character, and Time magazine described Stan and his friends as "sometimes cruel but with a core of innocence". He is amused by bodily functions and toilet humor, and his favorite television personalities are Terrance and Phillip, a Canadian duo whose comedy routines on their show-within-the-show revolve substantially around fart jokes.

Stan is an avid animal lover. He is highly against his uncle Jimbo's hunting, and was also known to commit to vegetarianism after feeling compassion for baby calves in a farm, even going as far to hide them in his room to protect them from being slaughtered. Later, he was forced to quit vegetarianism because of a severe illness he developed, however, he still fights for animal rights, becoming a member of PETA in "Douche and Turd" as well as saving whales and dolphins in "Whale Whores".

The only adult on the show that Stan liked was Chef, the cafeteria worker at his school, as Stan generally holds the rest of the show's adult population in low regard due to their tendency to both behave irrationally when subjected to the scams, cults, and sensationalized media stories of which he is often skeptical, and engage in hypocritical behavior. He doubts the legitimacy of holistic medicine, declares cults to be dangerous, and regards those claiming to be psychic mediums as frauds, specifically by declaring John Edward to be "the biggest douche in the universe".

In the season 15 episode "You're Getting Old", Stan became extremely cynical after his 10th birthday, and lost interest in many things that he once enjoyed.  Stan's friendships with the other main characters ended, his parents divorced, and he moved out of his home. This episode formed a cliffhanger and set off widespread speculation that the series was coming to an end. But the premiere of the second half of the season episode "Ass Burgers" resolved the arc, as Stan was erroneously diagnosed with Asperger's syndrome, and discovers Jameson Irish Whiskey cures cynicism. After struggling to repair his life, he finally explains he doesn't want things to go back to normal, when his parents get back together and his life is repaired.  Although the end of the episode implies Stan may be permanently bound to whiskey to continue an everyday life.

Cultural impact

In 2014, Stan was ranked by IGN at third place on their list of "The Top 25 South Park Characters", commenting that he "often acts as the voice of reason in the midst of the show's insane events, and in many ways he's more mature than his father Randy". The website concluded that "his history as one of the more stable and thoughtful characters in the series made him the perfect choice for the voice of Trey and Matt's own creative/professional frustrations".

Stan frequently offers his perspective on religion, and he was at the center of one of the most controversial episodes of the series, "Trapped in the Closet" (season nine, 2005), where he was recognized as the reincarnation of Scientology founder L. Ron Hubbard before denouncing the church as nothing more than "a big fat global scam".

In the show's 26 seasons, Stan has addressed other topics such as homosexuality, hate crime legislation, civil liberties, parenting, illegal immigration, voting, alcoholism, and race relations. His commentary on these issues have been interpreted as statements Parker and Stone are attempting to make to the viewing public, and these opinions have been subject to much critical analysis in the media and literary world. The book South Park and Philosophy: You Know, I Learned Something Today includes an essay in which East Carolina University philosophy professor Henry Jacoby compares Stan's actions and reasoning within the show to the philosophical teachings of William Kingdon Clifford, and another essay by Southern Illinois University philosophy professor John S. Gray which references Stan's decision to not vote for either candidate for a school mascot in the season eight (2004) episode "Douche and Turd" when describing political philosophy and the claimed pitfalls of a two-party system. Essays in the books South Park and Philosophy: Bigger, Longer, and More Penetrating, Blame Canada! South Park and Contemporary Culture, and Taking South Park Seriously have also analyzed Stan's perspectives within the framework of popular philosophical, theological, and political concepts.

References

External links

 Stan Marsh  at South Park Studios

Child characters in television
Child characters in animated films
Television characters introduced in 1992
Fictional characters from Colorado
Fictional characters based on real people
Fictional elementary school students
Fictional victims of domestic abuse
South Park characters
Comedy film characters
Male characters in animated series
Male characters in film
Animated characters introduced in 1992